Broke with Expensive Taste is the debut studio album by American rapper Azealia Banks. In 2011, Banks started working on the album despite not having signed to a record label at that time. A year later, she signed a contract deal with Interscope and Polydor Records to work on the album. However, she felt dissatisfied with the labels' representatives and consequently, she ended the contract with the labels in July 2014 and signed to Prospect Park. After being delayed for over two years, Broke with Expensive Taste was released on November 7, 2014 by Banks herself and Prospect Park via Caroline Records without any prior announcements at all.

Broke with Expensive Taste was described as a hip house and dance-pop record which incorporates elements from a wide range of genres, including hardcore punk, punk, trance, Bounce music, R&B and UK garage. The album received positive reviews from music critics, who praised Banks' musical diversity and opined that the album was "worth the wait".

The record spawned four singles: "Yung Rapunxel", "Heavy Metal and Reflective", "Chasing Time", and "Ice Princess". Broke with Expensive Taste peaked at number 30 on the US Billboard 200 and appeared on record charts of other five countries: Australia, Scotland, Belgium, Ireland, and the United Kingdom. Since its release the album has accumulated over 300 million streams on Spotify. In 2022, Rolling Stone placed it on their list of the '200 Greatest Hip Hop Albums of All Time'.

Background
In 2011, it was reported that Banks was working on a studio album with British producer Paul Epworth despite not having signed to a particular record label at that time. In January 2012, Banks signed a record deal with Interscope and Polydor Records to work on her album, and a month later, she announced the title of the album—Broke with Expensive Taste. Approximately a year later, she handed a complete album in to the labels. Banks initially thought that the album would receive favorable reception from the labels; however, the representatives told Banks that she had not recorded a "hit" single for the album. She consequently recorded a song called "Chasing Time" for the project, yet the label denied the track and forced Banks to choose "Soda" as the lead single, which made Banks become incredulous. Ultimately, Banks ended the record deal with Interscope/Polydor in July 2014. She later approached Jeff Kwatinetz and signed a contract with his company, Prospect Park. She reveals her dissatisfaction to Rolling Stone,

I just spent a whole 'nother fuckin' four months in the studio trying to come up with some shit, and you want to go with fuckin' 'Soda'? I really just lost it. That was the day you saw me on Twitter, like, 'The fuck? I'm tired of talking to these white guys about my shit.' It felt like they were playing some sort of head game. And you know I love conspiracy theories. I was like, 'They're trying to brainwash me! Fuck these guys!'

Music and lyrics

In regard to the album's sound, Banks has stated that she was aiming for something "just as stylish and authentic as anything that I do." She added that she did not want to do anything "young [or] mainstream" and described the album as "anti-pop". Steven J. Horowitz from Billboard characterized Broke with Expensive Taste as a hip house record with touchstones from R&B, UK garage, Bounce music and drum and bass. Mark Guiducci of Vogue noted the elements of trance and trap, while The Observers Suzie McCracken described the record as "an aggressive strain of hip hop" blending with UK garage, deep house and trap. Writing for The New York Times, Jon Pareles also detailed the fusion of Caribbean beats, punk and surf rock. On behalf of The Irish Times, reviewer Jim Carroll called Broke with Expensive Taste an album of "dance-pop gallivanting".

The album opens with "Idle Delilah", a glitchy mid-tempo track that contains "tropical, thuggish and quirky" sounds and was compared to the work of Lauryn Hill and Missy Elliott due to its use of both rapping and singing, which were noted for being rugged and velvety. "Gimme a Chance" contains feather-light synths, an '80s-style sample, bold brass instruments and haphazard DJ scratches. The song's production changes towards the end and takes influence from a bachata groove, while Banks sings in Spanish. "Ice Princess" is an uptempo song that juxtaposes a sample of Morgan Page's 2011 dance song "In the Air" against a heavy trap drum pattern.

"Yung Rapunxel" sees Banks alternating between rapping and shouting over a manic '90s Hi-NRG-influenced "witch-hop" beat. "Heavy Metal and Reflective" is  built over clanging synths and wobbling bass with elements of Bounce. "Chasing Time" is a dance-pop track, that takes influence from UK garage, deep house and jazz music. "Nude Beach a-Go-Go" is an alternate take on Ariel Pink's song of the same name, which is featured on Pom Pom (2014).

Release and promotion
In July 2013, Banks announced that the record would be released in the following fall; however, this was delayed to January, and again to March 2014. Ultimately, the album was released by Banks and Prospect Park via Caroline Records on November 7, 2014, without any prior announcements. In December 2013, Banks announced the first four tour dates in support of the album. The tour was set to begin in March 2014 in Glasgow, Scotland. However, in early March 2014, weeks before the opening date, Banks rescheduled the tour dates and cancelled some as the album's release was delayed. The rescheduled tour took place in Europe throughout September.

In January 2015, Banks began to announce tour dates to support the album. Touring began in Japan, in March 2015, and extended throughout the year. The tour marks Banks' first concert in New York since performing at the Bowery Ballroom in 2012 for her debut tour, The Mermaid Ball. Banks also played festivals to support the album, including Coachella, Reading and Leeds, and Glastonbury.

Singles

In January 2013, Banks announced that the album's lead single would be "Miss Amor", which would be accompanied by "Miss Camaraderie" as a B-side. Ultimately, the plan was cancelled and later that month, she confirmed that "Yung Rapunxel" would be the official lead single from Broke with Expensive Taste. The track was made available for streaming via SoundCloud in March 2013, and was released for digital sales a month later. "Yung Rapunxel" peaked at number 25 and 152 on the Australian Urban Singles Chart and UK Singles Chart, respectively.

On May 6, 2013, Banks announced that "ATM Jam" featuring Pharrell would serve as the second single from Broke with Expensive Taste. It was released on July 11, 2013. However, due to negative fan feedback and personal disinterest regarding the song, Banks later announced that "ATM Jam" would be removed from the album.

The second official single from Broke with Expensive Taste was "Heavy Metal and Reflective", which was released for digital sales on July 28, 2014. The song peaked at number 40 on the UK Indie Chart. Due to a leak of the song, "Chasing Time" was rush-released as the third single from the project, being released on September 22, 2014, a day after the leak. On March 23, 2015, "Ice Princess" was released as the fourth single from Broke with Expensive Taste. The music video for "Ice Princess", filmed on February 2 and 3, 2015 in Montreal, Quebec, Canada, was released on March 31, 2015.

In further promotional efforts for the album, a music video for a non-single track "Wallace" was filmed in April, 2014 in New York City and released on March 11, 2015. The video is an interactive project released through Google Cloud. Years later on March 20, 2018, Banks released the music video for non-single "Soda". The video portrays Banks walking through the desert and sitting on rocks whilst shots jump to her band playing on the drums.

Critical reception

Broke with Expensive Taste received positive reviews from critics. At Metacritic, which assigns a normalized rating out of 100 to reviews from mainstream publications, the album received an average score of 77, based on 26 reviews, indicating "generally favorable reviews". In Rolling Stone, Suzy Exposito hailed the record as possibly "the year's boldest release", while Matthew Horton from NME called it "a cascading flood of madcap imagination". Suzie McCracken of The Observer deemed it "a contender for album of the year" while praising the music's eclecticism: "Banks immerses herself in 90s nostalgia, spitting darkly and sharply over tracks full of elements of UK garage, deep house and trap (an aggressive strain of hip-hop)." Brennan Carley from Spin felt that Banks displayed a "burst of personality" and on an album "dripping in confidence, class, bursts of brilliance, and personality". Critic Robert Christgau commended her vocal performances but stated that while her understanding of sex was more dynamic than her male counterparts', "her troubles are the usual star-time overindulgences, and just about every terrific song here is a boast one way or another. Yet just about every song is a serious pleasure regardless."

In a less enthusiastic review for Clash, Mike Diver felt the album was as much enjoyable as it was "schizophrenic and really quite silly in places". Nolan Feeney of Time qualified his praise of Banks' ability to make the lines in her raps sound melodious: "She lines up syllables like a firing squad, repeating the same sounds and hums and clicks with a sing-song-y cadence. When she's in the zone, it's vaguely hypnotic. The downside is that it's also a limited tool set — her flows sometimes sound too much like her other verses. Get deep into one Azealia Banks song, and you'll often hear a line or two that remind you of another." Fred Thomas from AllMusic said the record's highlights, including "the time-tested singles", were spoiled by musically incongruous filler, making it feel "like a piecemeal collection of tracks that spike and dip in terms of quality and intent".

Broke with Expensive Taste appeared on several publications' lists of 2014's best albums. It was ranked number 38 by Spin, number 25 by Pitchfork, number 15 by Complex, number 10 by Boston Globe critic James Reed and Nolan Feeney from Time, and number 3 by Jon Pareles of The New York Times and Cosmopolitan editor Eliza Thompson. In Rolling Stones list of the year's best rap records, it was named the 10th best and "the sort of effortless triumph that deserves to outshine the Internet circus". Broke with Expensive Taste was also voted the 14th best album of 2014 in the Pazz & Jop, an annual poll of American critics nationwide, published by The Village Voice. Robert Christgau, the poll's creator, named it the year's 7th best album in his own ballot.

Commercial performance
Broke with Expensive Taste debuted at number 62 on the UK Albums Chart for the week ending November 15, 2014, with 1,751 copies sold. The album debuted at number 30 on the US Billboard 200, selling 11,000 copies. In its second week of sales, the album dropped to number 98 on the chart, selling an additional 4,096 copies. As of April 2015, Broke with Expensive Taste has sold 31,000 copies in the United States.

Track listing
Credits for Broke with Expensive Taste are adapted from the digital booklet.

Sample credits
"Idle Delilah" contains excerpts from "WAD" by Pearson Sound
"Gimme a Chance" contains excerpts from "Knock That Door" by Enon
"Desperado" contains excerpts from "Banderlero Desperado" by MJ Cole
"JFK" contains excerpts from "Breezin'" by Boddika
"212" contains elements of "Float My Boat" by Lazy Jay
"Ice Princess" contains samples from "In the Air" by Morgan Page featuring Angela McCluskey
"Yung Rapunxel" contains a sample of "No More Drama" by Mary J. Blige and "Fuck da' Haters" by Ruff Ryders and samples a portion of "Stop Playing Games" by 8Ball
"Miss Amor" contains excerpts from "Coreshine Voodoo" by Lone
"Miss Camaraderie" contains excerpts from "Rapid Racer" by Lone

Personnel
Credits adapted from AllMusic.

Steve Ace – production
The Apple Juice Kid – production
AraabMuzik – production
David Baker – mixing assistance, vocal engineering
Azealia Banks – A&R, composition, executive production, vocals
David Boyd – assistance, engineering assistance, engineering, vocal engineering
Oskar Cartaya – composition
Ronald "Flippa" Colson – composition
Nick Conceller – engineering, mixing
Calum Crease – art direction
Warren "Oak" Felder – composition
Flippa123 – production
James Strife – composition
Jack Fuller – composition
Jonathan Harris – composition
Andrew Hey – bass, engineering, guitar, horn engineering, vocal engineering
Dan Higgins – clarinet
Kevin James – composition
Rob Kinelski – mixing
Dave Kutch – mastering

Lazy Jay – vocals
Theophilus London – composition, vocals
Jef Martens – composition, production
Harvey Mason, Jr. – composition, vibraphone
Trevor McFedries – composition, production
Ric McRae – engineering, mixing
Steve Mostyn – composition
Filip Nikolić – composition, production
Oakwud – production
Abraham Orellana – composition
Ariel Pink – production
Rob Sizwe Price-Guma – engineering assistance, engineering
Ariel Rosenberg – composition
Scntst – composition, production
Kelly Sheehan – composition, engineering
Travis Stewart – composition, production
The Underdogs – additional production, executive production
Julian "Lil Internet" Wadsworth – composition, production
Andrew "Pop" Wansel – composition

Charts

Release history

References

External links
 

2014 debut albums
Azealia Banks albums
Albums produced by the Underdogs (production team)